Kart Fighter ("Mario Fighter") is an unlicensed 2D fighting game produced for the Nintendo Famicom by Taiwanese studio Hummer Team. The game features unauthorized appearances by Nintendo's mascot Mario and the rest of the cast of Super Mario Kart in a port of Street Fighter II. Kart Fighter has received some media attention, including mostly positive reviews, in part because of its perceived similarity to the later Super Smash Bros. series.

Gameplay

Kart Fighter follows many of the rules and conventions already established for the fighting game genre by the time of its release. The player engages opponents in one-on-one close quarter combat. The object of each round is to deplete the opponent's vitality before the timer runs out. Because it is an adaptation of Street Fighter II, the game controls resemble those of the Street Fighter series. The player uses the D-pad to move the character towards or away from the opponent or to jump. The A and B buttons perform punches and kicks, as well as jump punches and jump kicks when combined with movement. Additionally, each character has a selection of special moves performed by inputting a combination of directional and button-based commands. Unlike Street Fighter II, nearly all characters have some form of projectile attack available as a special move, but the blocking system is more limited.

Five difficulty levels are available for solo play. A second player can also select a character, allowing for two-player matches. However, because no indication of this feature appears in game, it can be easily overlooked.

Characters
All eight playable characters from Super Mario Kart appear in Kart Fighter, although several have been renamed or are Japanese versions of names– Mari (Mario), Luigi, Peach (Princess Toadstool), Yossy (Yoshi), Kupa (Bowser), Donkey (Donkey Kong Jr.), Nokonoko (Koopa Troopa), and Kinopio (Toad). Many of the characters' appearances are closely adapted from Super Mario Kart sprites, although they are not to scale. However, Donkey Kong Jr. has a substantially different appearance and Princess Peach appears in a miniskirt and boots, similar to Chun-Li of Street Fighter fame.

Development
During the 1980s and 1990s, production of pirate Famicom games in East Asia was commonplace, aided by the Famicom's absence of the 10NES lockout chip included in North American versions of the Nintendo Entertainment System. The commercial success of Street Fighter II made it a particularly frequent choice for unauthorized ports and adaptations. Kart Fighter was a resulting game made from this craze, developed by a team known as Hummer Team or Gouder, and published by Hong Kong-based Ge De Industry, likely in 1993.

Kart Fighter emulated the general look of the characters from the 1992 Super Famicom Super Mario Kart. The limited hardware of the 8-bit Famicom would have forced the characters to look far worse, especially when the source material was on a 16-bit platform, being limited to four colors instead of 16. Hummer Team overcame this by combining two separate sprites to utilize more colors for each character. Material from other games were also stolen, including a stage background taken from Little Nemo: The Dream Master.

Hummer Team also created other unauthorized Street Fighter II adaptations.  One such game was included on the 1998 Super HIK 4 in 1 12M multicart, in which Mario appeared alongside characters from the Street Fighter franchise. The same engine Kart Fighter used was also modded to create the Sailor Moon-themed AV Bishoujo Senshi Girl Fighting.

Legacy
Several years after its release, Kart Fighter received critical attention for its similarities to the Super Smash Bros. series.  Reviews were generally positive, especially in the context of fighting games on the NES or unauthorized NES games, categories viewed as having typically poor quality. Reviews cited its originality, music, and relative lack of bugs, with several considering it one of the best unauthorized games of its era, meeting or exceeding the quality of similar licensed games such as TMNT: Tournament Fighters.

However, Complex considered Kart Fighter the worst fighting game ever made. Other reviewers remarked negatively on the screen flicker resulting from the game's sprite system, poor AI, missing menu options, and lack of a proper ending.

See also
 Somari, another unlicensed Hummer Team game featuring Mario

References

1993 video games
Mario Kart
Nintendo Entertainment System games
Nintendo Entertainment System-only games
Unauthorized video games
Unofficial works based on Mario
Fighting games
Multiplayer and single-player video games
Video games developed in Taiwan